The 2017 Copa CONMEBOL Libertadores Femenina de Futsal was the 4th edition of the Copa Libertadores Femenina de Futsal, South America's premier women's club futsal tournament organized by CONMEBOL.

The tournament was hosted by Paraguay and played from 15 to 22 July 2017.

Teams
The competition was contested by 10 teams: one entry from each of the ten CONMEBOL associations.

Venues
The matches were played at the Polideportivo del Comité Olímpico Paraguayo in Luque.

Draw
The draw of the tournament was held on 28 June 2017, 11:30 PYT (UTC−4), at the conference room of Estadio Defensores del Chaco in Asunción. The 10 teams were drawn into two groups of five containing one team from each of the four seeding pots. The following two teams were seeded:
Group A: champions of the host association, Sport Colonial (Paraguay)
Group B: representatives of the association of the 2016 Copa Libertadores Femenina de Futsal champions, Unochapecó (Brazil)

The other teams were seeded based on the results of their association in the 2016 Copa Libertadores Femenina de Futsal.

Notes

Squads
Each team had to submit a squad of 14 players, including a minimum of two goalkeepers (Regulations Article 4.1).

Match officials
A total of 16 referees were appointed for the tournament.

Group stage
The top two teams of each group advanced to the semi-finals, while the teams in third, fourth and fifth advanced to the fifth place, seventh place, and ninth place play-offs respectively. The teams were ranked according to points (3 points for a win, 1 point for a draw, 0 points for a loss). If tied on points, tiebreakers were applied in the following order (Regulations Article 6.2):
Results in head-to-head matches between tied teams (points, goal difference, goals scored);
Goal difference in all matches;
Goals scored in all matches;
Drawing of lots.

All times were local, PYT (UTC−4).

Group A

Group B

Knockout stage
In the semi-finals and final, extra time and penalty shoot-out are used to decide the winner if necessary. In the classification matches, penalty shoot-out (no extra time) were used to decide the winner if necessary.

Bracket

Ninth place play-off

Seventh place play-off

Fifth place play-off

Semi-finals

Third place play-off

Final

Final ranking

References

External links
CONMEBOL Libertadores de Futsal Femenino Paraguay 2017, CONMEBOL.com

2017
2017 in South American futsal
2017 in Paraguayan football
July 2017 sports events in South America
International futsal competitions hosted by Paraguay